Stephen Constantine (born 13 June 1947) is professor emeritus of modern British history at Lancaster University. He received his BA from Wadham College, Oxford, in 1968 and his D.Phil from  Oxford, in 1984. Constantine joined Lancaster University in 1971 and retired in 2010. He is a fellow of the Royal Historical Society.

Constantine's research relates to the history of St Helena, the history of Gibraltar, the publicity campaigns of the Empire Marketing Board, migration and settlement into and around the British Empire and Commonwealth, and the dispatch overseas as child migrants of children in care in the UK.

Selected publications

1980s

1990s

2000s

References 

Living people
Academics of Lancaster University
Alumni of Wadham College, Oxford
Alumni of Nuffield College, Oxford
Fellows of the Royal Historical Society
1947 births